The Esk River is a river located in the Wet Tropics of Far North Queensland, Australia.

Course and features
The river rises below Dowlings Hill, sourced by runoff from the Great Dividing Range, and flows north across the mostly uninhabited coastal plain. The Esk River enters the Annan Forest Reserve and flows through a wetland dominated by mangroves. The river descends  over its  course.

Much of the Esk River catchment lies within protected area tenure.  the river appeared to be in a healthy condition with limited siltation and only infrequent pockets of erosion.

See also

References

External links

Rivers of Far North Queensland
Wet Tropics of Queensland
Bodies of water of the Coral Sea